Norberto Aroldi (12 August 1931 – 19 May 1978) was an Argentine film actor, poet  and screenwriter.

Born in Buenos Aires, he starred in the Cinema of Argentina in the 1960s and 1970s and wrote for films such as Aconcagua (1964) and El Andador (1967).

A lifelong smoker, he died of lung cancer on 19 May 1978

Selected filmography
 Scandal in the Family (1967)

External links
 

1932 births
1978 deaths
20th-century Argentine male actors
20th-century Argentine poets
20th-century Argentine writers
20th-century Argentine male writers
Argentine male film actors
Male screenwriters
Argentine male poets
Argentine people of Italian descent
Male actors from Buenos Aires
Writers from Buenos Aires
20th-century Argentine screenwriters
Deaths from lung cancer in Argentina